"Better Place" is the first single from the self-titled studio album by the band Saint Asonia. The song has been released digitally via Spotify and iTunes. It was nominated at the 2016 Canadian Radio Music Awards for the "Best New Group or Solo Artist: Mainstream Rock" award.

Composition
The song runs at 188 BPM and is in the key of F# major. Gontier explains the meaning and writing behind "Better Place".

Music video
The band filmed a video for the song in Los Angeles with director P. R. Brown and it's been co-directed by Adam Gontier. The music video was released on July 31, 2015 the same day that Saint Asonia's debut album was released via RCA. The clip features the band performing at an abandoned building with singer Adam Gontier venturing out on a very narrow ledge to sing while the band performs inside. Speaking about creating the video, Gontier states:

Personnel
 Adam Gontier – lead vocals, rhythm guitar
 Mike Mushok – lead guitar
 Corey Lowery – bass
 Rich Beddoe – drums
 Johnny K – producer

Charts

Weekly charts

Year-end charts

References

2015 debut singles
2015 songs
Songs written by Adam Gontier
Song recordings produced by Johnny K
Alternative metal songs
Saint Asonia songs